Anrijs is a Latvian masculine given name. It is an alternative spelling of Henrijs and alternative of Indriķis, the Latvian forms of Henry. It may refer to:
 Anrijs Matīss (born 1973), Latvian politician and former Minister for Transport of Latvia
 , Latvian actor

Latvian masculine given names